Vallavilai is a fishing village in Kollankodu panchayat,  Kanyakumari district, Tamil Nadu, India. 

As of 2011 India census Vallavilai had a population of 10282. Males constitute 51% of the population and Females 49%. Vallavilai has an average literacy rate of 86%, higher than the national average of 59.5%. Male literacy is 78% and female 75%. In Vallavilai 11% of the population is under 6 years of age.

Places of Worship
St. Mary's Church
St. Antony's Crusade
St. Jude's Crusade
Juma Masjid
Sri Rajarajeshwari Ishakkiamman Temple

Education
 Little flower Nursery School
 St. Jude's High School
 Government Primary School

References

Villages in Kanyakumari district